Carl Beukes (born 3 October 1976) is a South African actor best known for his roles as Paul McPherson in Isidingo and as the archangel Gabriel in Dominion. Beukes is a graduate of The National School of the Arts, where he studied Speech & Drama. In addition to his credited film, television, and other screen roles, Beukes has also been in the cast of the stage productions Macbeth, Certified Male, Amadeus, Popcorn, Art, Black Dog, and Tape.

As of 2016, Beukes is working on a leading role in the pilot of an untitled Mars Project Drama for The CW.

Filmography

Personal life 
Beukes married in November 2014 and had his honeymoon in Zanzibar. In 2003, he moved to London and lived there for sixteen months before returning to South Africa in September 2004. Beukes has stated that his favorite stage work was in Certified Male, Macbeth and ''Art'.

Commenting on his future plans: "My ideal goal would be to have a balance of homegrown and international work. I have always, since I was a kid, wanted to work with the big boys. I would love to make some American movies and get into that industry. At the moment, I have a foot in the door and I am starting to do that. I need to ride this wave while it is going. I want to come back and do more film. The South African film industry is budding and I don’t want to not be a part of it. It’s been my bread and butter all my life.”

References

External links 

1976 births
Living people
21st-century South African male actors
South African male film actors
South African male television actors
South African male models
South African male stage actors